The 1924 North Carolina gubernatorial election was held on November 4, 1924. Democratic nominee Angus Wilton McLean defeated Republican nominee Isaac Melson Meekins with 61.33% of the vote.

Primary elections
Primary elections were held on June 7, 1924.

Democratic primary

Candidates
Angus Wilton McLean, former member of the War Finance Corporation board
Josiah Bailey, former United States Collector of Internal Revenue for North Carolina

Results

General election

Candidates
Angus Wilton McLean, Democratic
Isaac Melson Meekins, Republican

Results

References

1924
North Carolina
Gubernatorial